Bertus Bul (16 May 1897 – 4 October 1972) was a Dutch footballer. He played in six matches for the Netherlands national football team from 1923 to 1926.

References

External links
 

1897 births
1972 deaths
Dutch footballers
Netherlands international footballers
Footballers from Rotterdam
Association football defenders
Feyenoord players